Takatsugu (written: 高次) is a masculine Japanese given name. Notable people with the name include:

 (1890–1967), Imperial Japanese Navy admiral
 (1560–1609), Japanese daimyō

Japanese masculine given names